G.Y. Krishnan (4 October 1929 - 2 May 2001) was an Indian politician and He served as Member of Parliament (MP) 4 times, represented the Kolar Constituency in Lok Sabha, the lower house of the Indian Parliament. He was also Member of Parliamentary Delegation to Russia, 1976.

Early life and background 
G. Y. Krishnan was born on 4 October 1929 in Madava Gurjenahalli of Kolar in Karnataka. He completed his education B.A. and B.L. from Maharaja's College, Mysore and Government Law College, Bangalore.

Personal life 
G. Y. Krishnan married Saroja Lakshmi Devamma in 1955. The couple had 3 sons and 6 daughters.

Position held

Political career 
In 1972, G. Y. Krishnan served as Vice President 1972 to 1976 of the Federation of Karnataka State Transport Corporation Employees Union. As President Advisor from 1967 to 1980 at Bharat Gold Mines Workers Union and Bharat Earth Movers Workers. He was the Founder and President of Akhil Bharat Wadder Samaj Sangh (Regd.) (Association of stone-cutters & earth diggers) (1968) and Builders India Ltd. (1978). 

He was also a Member of the committee on the Welfare of Scheduled Castes and Scheduled Tribes (1973 - 1976) and several joint select committees like Rubber Board and  Central Silk Board.

Died 
G. Y. Krishnan died on 20 May 2001 at the age of 72.

References

1929 births
People from Kolar district
India MPs 1980–1984
India MPs 1984–1989
India MPs 1989–1991
India MPs 1991–1996
Karnataka politicians
Lok Sabha members from Karnataka
Living people
Indian National Congress politicians from Karnataka